A circular mil is a unit of area, equal to the area of a circle with a diameter of one mil (one thousandth of an inch or ). It is a unit intended for referring to the area of a wire with a circular cross section. As the definition of the unit contains , it is easy to calculate area values in circular mils knowing the diameter in mils.

The area in circular mils, of a circle with a diameter of  mils, is given by the formula:

In Canada and the United States, the Canadian Electrical Code (CEC) and the National Electrical Code (NEC), respectively, use the circular mil to define wire sizes larger than 0000 AWG. In many NEC publications and uses, large wires may be expressed in thousands of circular mils, which is abbreviated in two different ways: kcmil or MCM. For example, one common wire size used in the NEC has a cross-section of 250,000 circular mils, written as 250 kcmil or 250 MCM, which is the first size larger than 0000 AWG used within the NEC.

1000 circular mil equals , so for many purposes, a ratio of 2 MCM ≈ 1 mm2 can be used with negligible (1.3%) error.

Equivalence to other units of area
As a unit of area, the circular mil can be converted to other units such as square inches or square millimetres.

1 circular mil is approximately equal to:
 0.7854 square mils (1 square mil is about 1.273 circular mils)
 7.854 × 10−7 square inches (1 square inch is about 1.273 million circular mils)
 5.067 × 10−10 square metres
 5.067 × 10−4 square millimetres
 506.7 μm

1000 circular mils = 1 MCM or 1 kcmil, and is (approximately) equal to:
 0.5067 mm, so 2 kcmil ≈ 1 mm (a 1.3% error)

Therefore, for practical purposes such as wire choice, 2 kcmil ≈ 1 mm is a reasonable rule of thumb for many applications.

Square mils
In square mils, the area of a circle with a diameter of 1 mil is:

By definition, this area is also equal to 1 circular mil, so:

The formula for the area of an arbitrary circle in circular mils can be derived by applying this conversion factor to the standard formula for the area of a circle (which gives its result in square mils).

Square inches

To equate circular mils with square inches rather than square mils, the definition of a mil in inches can be substituted:

Square millimetres

Likewise, since 1 inch is defined as exactly 25.4mm, 1mil is equal to exactly 0.0254mm, so a similar conversion is possible from circular mils to square millimetres:

Example calculations

A 0000 AWG solid wire is defined to have a diameter of exactly . The cross-sectional area of this wire is:

Formula 1: circular mil 

Note: 1 inch = 1000 mils

(This is the same result as the AWG circular mil formula shown below for n = −3)

Formula 2: square mil

Formula 3: square inch

Calculating diameter from area 

When large diameter wire sizes are specified in kcmil, such as the widely used 250 kcmil and 350 kcmil wires, the diameter of the wire can be calculated from the area without using :

Note: We first convert from kcmil to circular mil

Thus, this wire would have a diameter of a half inch or 12.7 mm.

Metric equivalent
Some tables give conversions to circular millimetres (cmm).  The area in cmm is defined as the square of the wire diameter in mm.  However, this unit is rarely used in practice.  One of the few examples is in a patent for a bariatric weight loss device.

AWG circular mil formula
The formula to calculate the circular mil for any given AWG (American Wire Gauge) size is as follows.  represents the circular mil area for the AWG size .

For example, a number 12 gauge wire would use :  

Sizes with multiple zeros are successively larger than 0AWG and can be denoted using "number of zeros/0"; for example "4/0" for 0000AWG. For an /0AWG wire, use 
 in the above formula.

For example, 0000AWG (4/0AWG), would use ; and the calculated result would be 211,600 circular mils.

Standard sizes
Standard sizes are from 250 to 400 in increments of 50kcmil, 400 to 1000 in increments of 100kcmil, and from 1000 to 2000 in increments of 250kcmil.

The diameter in the table below is that of a solid rod with the given conductor area in circular mils. Stranded wire is  around 5% larger in diameter to allow for gaps between the strands, depending on the number and size of strands.

Note: For smaller wires, consult .

See also
 Thou (length)
 Square mil
 
 IEC 60228, the metric wire-size standard used in most parts of the world.
 American Wire Gauge (AWG), used primarily in the US and Canada
 Standard Wire Gauge (SWG), the British imperial standard BS3737, superseded by the metric.
 Stubs Iron Wire Gauge
 Jewelry wire gauge
 Body jewelry sizes
 Electrical wiring
 Number 8 wire, a term used in the New Zealand vernacular

References

Units of area